Drypetes ellisii  is lesser known endemic tree of the family Euphorbiaceae described from the Andaman Islands  in the Bay of Bengal. The type locality of this species is Mount Harriet National Park. This taxon is rather rare in occurrence grows up to 10m in height.

References

ellisii